Jeroen Rauwerdink (born 13 September 1985) is a Dutch male volleyball player. He is part of the Netherlands men's national volleyball team. On club level he plays for Dynamo Apeldoorn. Jeroen Rauwerdink is, with his 337 caps (on 26 April 2021), the third most capped player in the national team.

Sporting achievements

Clubs

CEV Cup
  2002/2003 - with Dynamo Apeldoorn
  2012/2013 - with Top Volley Latina

National championships
 2002/2003  Dutch Championship, with Dynamo Apeldoorn
 2006/2007  Dutch Championship, with Dynamo Apeldoorn
 2007/2008  Dutch Championship, with Dynamo Apeldoorn
 2017/2018  Greek Championship, with Olympiacos Piraeus
 2018/2019  Greek Championship, with Olympiacos Piraeus

National trophies
 2006/2007  Dutch SuperCup 2007, with Dynamo Apeldoorn
 2001/2002  Dutch Cup, with Dynamo Apeldoorn
 2007/2008  Dutch Cup, with Dynamo Apeldoorn

Greek League Cup
 2017/2018  Greek League Cup, with Olympiacos Piraeus

 2018/2019  Greek League Cup, with Olympiacos Piraeus

Individually
 2018-19 Greek Championship MVP

National team
 2006  European League
 2008  European League
 2012  European League

References

External links
Profile at FIVB.org
 Dutch Volleyball National Team 2017 at www.cev.lu
 Jeroen Rauwerdink's International presence  at www.cev.lu
 Rauwerdink at Olympiacos Piraeus - Previous teams at www.osfp.gr 
 Rauwerdink's return at Top Volley Latina at www.top-volley.it 
 Rauwerdink's career in Italy at www.edesseredonna.it 
 http://www.dinto.nl/nw-867-7-44761/nieuws/nederland_wint_european_league.html The Netherlands winner of European League 2006] at www.dinto.nl 
 Rauwerdink captain of Dutch National team in 2012 European League at www.peruvoley.com

1985 births
Living people
Dutch men's volleyball players
Olympiacos S.C. players
People from Zeist
Dutch expatriate sportspeople in Greece
Dutch expatriate sportspeople in Italy
Dutch expatriate sportspeople in Turkey
Expatriate volleyball players in Greece
Expatriate volleyball players in Italy
Expatriate volleyball players in Turkey
Sportspeople from Utrecht (province)